Xu Xuanping, was a Taoist hermit and poet of the Chinese Tang dynasty. He was said to have lived south of the Yangtze River in Huizhou. His legend relates that he left the city of Yangshan to become a recluse and build a home in Nan Mountain.

His legendary description is that he was very tall, perhaps more than six foot, with a beard that reached to his navel and hair down to his feet. He only ate uncooked food. He walked with a gait like a running horse and that each time he carried firewood down from the hills to the town to sell he would recite this poem:

At dawn I carry the firewood to sell
To buy wine today, at dusk I will return
Please tell me the way to get home?
Just follow the mountain track up into the clouds

Li Bai (the great Tang Dynasty poet) was said to have searched for Xu Xuanping, but couldn't find him. He was, however, inspired to compose some poetry, after seeing the Immortal's Bridge, before he departed.

According to some schools of T'ai chi ch'uan, Xu is considered to be the Tao Yin teacher of Zhang Sanfeng, whom they say later created the martial art of T'ai chi ch'uan. Other schools hold that Xu himself was a T'ai chi ch'uan practitioner, and that the style Xu Xuanping passed down was simply called "37", because it consisted of 37 named styles or techniques. During this time it was also known as Chang Quan 長拳 or Long Boxing as a reference to the flowing power of the Yangtze River 揚子江, (which is also known as the Chang Jiang 長江 or Long River). He had a disciple called Song Yuanqiao who passed the Song Family T'ai chi ch'uan system down through the generations to Song Shuming.

References

Cheng, Tinhung. Tai Chi Transcendent Art, The Hong Kong Tai Chi Association Press, Hong Kong, 1976. (only available in Chinese)
Wile, Douglas Lost T'ai-chi Classics from the late Ch'ing Dynasty State University of New York Press, Albany, 1996. 

8th-century Chinese poets
Chinese tai chi practitioners
Chinese hermits
People from Huangshan
Poets from Anhui
Sportspeople from Anhui
Tang dynasty poets
Tang dynasty Taoists